Ida Canepa Ballasiotes (May 25, 1936 – November 23, 2014) was an American politician from the state of Washington.

Born in Rochester, New York, Ballasiotes moved with her family to Phoenix, Arizona. She married and then moved to Tacoma, Washington. Ballasiotes received her bachelor's degree from University of Puget Sound and worked in human resources. She moved with her family to Seattle, Washington and then to Mercer Island, Washington. From 1992 until 2002, Ballasiotes served in the Washington House of Representatives as a Republican representing Washington's 41st legislative district. In 1993, she filed Initiative 593, which was approved at the ballot and became the first three-strikes law in the nation.

She died in Seattle, Washington.

References

External links 
 Ida Ballasiotes at ourcampaigns.com

1936 births
2014 deaths
Politicians from Rochester, New York
People from Mercer Island, Washington
University of Puget Sound alumni
Women state legislators in Washington (state)
Republican Party members of the Washington House of Representatives
21st-century American women